True Audio (TTA) is a lossless compressor for multichannel 8, 16 and 24 bits audio data.
.tta is the extension to filenames of audio files created by the True Audio codec.

Codec overview 
True Audio compresses up to 30% of the original, broadly similar to FLAC and APE. It features a real-time encoding and decoding algorithm and hardware compression support. As with most other lossless codecs, plugins are available for most media players.

TTA performs lossless compression on multichannel 8, 16 and 24      bit data of uncompressed wav input files. The term "lossless" refers to the fact that such compression results in no data or quality loss; when decompressed, the audio file data are bit-identical to those of their originals. Compression ratios achieved by the TTA  codec vary, depending on music type, but range from 30% to 70% of the original. The TTA lossless compressed audio format supports both ID3v1/ID3v2 information tags and APEv2.

The TTA lossless audio codec allows for the storage of up to 20 audio CDs worth of music on a single DVD-R, retaining the original CD quality audio, plus detailed information in the ID3 tag format.

All TTA source code and binaries are freely available and distributed under GPL Open Source licenses.

Software support 
Listed below is software that has TTA format support:

Hardware support 
Audio players that run Rockbox support TTA.

See also 

 Lossless data compression
 Lossy data compression
 Audio data compression
 Comparison of audio coding formats
 Meridian Lossless Packing

References

External links 
 
 Project @ Sourceforge.Net

Lossless audio codecs
Free audio codecs
Cross-platform software